Ellis Coffee Company is a United States coffee roaster and retailer headquartered in Philadelphia. The company currently ships its products to a majority of supermarkets and retail stores in Delaware Valley. The company is headquartered at 2835 Bridge St in Philadelphia.

History
Ellis Coffee Company was founded by Allen Cuthbert in 1854 as a small coffee shop in Philadelphia. In 1871, Francis Bond succeeded Cuthbert as owner. Bond later hired John Ellis who was twelve at the time. Ellis expanded the company, offering its products to local restaurants and hotels. Ellis purchased the company in 1908, and renamed it John Ellis & Brother Coffee and Tea Company. This was the retail company. Ellis also started a wholesale company supplying restaurants, hotels, and clubs. This company was called Ellis Importing. In 1952, Harry Strauss purchased Ellis Importing from Ellis. The retail business was not part of the sale and was closed. As of 2018, the Strauss family maintains ownership of the company.

Products
In 2016, the company began offering single-serve coffee container called E-cups which stands for Ellis.

See also
 Intelligentsia Coffee & Tea
 Counter Culture Coffee
 Stumptown Coffee

References

External links
 

Food and drink companies based in Philadelphia
Coffee companies of the United States
Coffee brands
American companies established in 1854
1854 establishments in Pennsylvania